After the formation of the Karzai administration in late 2001, the Afghan Armed Forces were gradually reestablished by the United States and its allies.

Initially, a new land force, the Afghan National Army (ANA), was created, whose planned size grew from 70,000 in 2002 to, eventually, a target of 194,000 set in mid-2011. The army's air arm, the Afghan National Army Air Corps, later split off to become an independent branch, the Afghan Air Force (AAF). The Afghan Army and Air Force were supervised by the Afghan Ministry of Defense. Commandos and Special Forces were also trained as part of the army. Training was managed initially by the U.S. Office of Military Cooperation-Afghanistan (2002–05); followed by the Office of Security Cooperation-Afghanistan (2005–06); and then Combined Security Transition Command-Afghanistan (2006); then integrated into the NATO Training Mission-Afghanistan (2009), finally succeeded by the Resolute Support Mission from 2014. Sedra comments that the 'constant changes to the architecture of the reform process contributed to the 'institutional schizophrenia' that engulfed it. Constant turnover in the U.S. Army personnel supervising the programmes would not have helped.

By 2006, more than 60,000 former militiamen from around the country were disarmed. In 2007, it was reported that Disarmament, Demobilization and Reintegration programmes had dismantled 274 paramilitary organizations, reintegrated over 62,000 militia members into civilian life, and recovered more than 84,000 weapons, including heavy weapons. But The New York Times also reported a rise in hoarded weapons and a growing Taliban threat, even in the north of the country. The Afghan National Development Strategy of 2008 explained that the aim of Disbandment of Illegal Armed Groups programme was to ban all illegal armed groups in all provinces of the country. Approximately 2,000 such groups were identified; most of them surrendered to the Afghan government or joined the new armed forces.

Air Force 

The Afghan Air Force was relatively capable before and during the 1980s but by late 2001, the number of operational aircraft available was minimal. The United States and its allies quickly eliminated the remaining strength and ability of the Taliban to operate aircraft in the opening stages of their intervention. With the occupation of airbases by American forces it became clear how destitute the Air Force had become since the withdrawal of the Soviet Union. Most aircraft were only remnants rusting away for a decade or more. Many others were relocated to neighboring countries for storage purposes or sold cheaply. The AAF was reduced to a very small force while the country was torn by civil war. It was gradually strengthened by CSTC-A's NATO-led multinational Combined Air Power Transition Force.

The Afghan Air Force had over 200 refurbished aircraft, which includes A-29 Super Tucano attack aircraft, Lockheed C-130 Hercules and Pilatus PC-12s military transport aircraft, as well as UH-60A Black Hawk, Mil Mi-17, Mi-24, and other types of helicopters. It also included trainers such as Aero L-39 Albatros and Cessna 182. The manpower of the Afghan Air Force was around 7,000, which includes over 450 pilots. It also had a small number of female pilots.

Problems with the Army

During the Bonn Conference on Afghanistan, on 1 December 2001, President Hamid Karzai issued a decree reestablishing a unified army, the Afghan National Army. The decree set a size target of 70,000 and laid out the planned army structure. There had been significant disagreement over the size of the army that was needed. A Ministry of Defense-issued paper said that at least 200,000 active troops were needed. The Afghan Ministry of Defence loudly objected to the smaller, volunteer, nature of the new army, a change from the previous usage of conscripts.
Afghan factions jostled to either delay the development of the ANA, or acquire as much control over it as possible.

In 2010, the army had limited fighting capacity. Even the best Afghan units lacked training, discipline and adequate reinforcements. In one new unit in Baghlan Province, soldiers had been found cowering in ditches rather than fighting. Some were suspected of collaborating with the Taliban. "They don't have the basics, so they lay down," said Capt. Michael Bell, who was one of a team of US and Hungarian mentors tasked with training Afghan soldiers. "I ran around for an hour trying to get them to shoot, getting fired on. I couldn't get them to shoot their weapons." In addition, 9 out of 10 soldiers in the Afghan National Army were illiterate.

The Afghan Army was plagued by inefficiency and endemic corruption. US training efforts were drastically slowed by the problems. US trainers reported missing vehicles, weapons and other military equipment, and outright theft of fuel. Death threats were leveled against US officers who tried to stop Afghan soldiers from stealing. Afghan soldiers often snipped the command wires of IEDs instead of marking them and waiting for US forces to come to detonate them. This allowed insurgents to return and reconnect them. US trainers frequently removed the cell phones of Afghan soldiers hours before a mission for fear that the operation would be compromised. American trainers often spent much time verifying that Afghan rosters were accurate — that they were not padded with "ghosts" being "paid" by Afghan commanders who stole the wages.

Desertion was a significant problem. One in every four combat soldiers quit the Afghan Army during the 12-month period ending in September 2009, according to data from the US Defense Department and the Inspector General for Reconstruction in Afghanistan.

The motto of the army was reported as “God, Country, Duty”

In early 2015, Philip Munch of the Afghanistan Analysts' Network wrote that "...the available evidence suggests that many senior ANSF members, in particular, use their positions to enrich themselves. Within the ANSF there are also strong external loyalties to factions who themselves compete for influence and access to resources. All this means that the ANSF may not work as they officially should. Rather it appears that the political economy of the ANSF prevents them from working like modern organisations – the very prerequisite of the Resolute Support Mission." Formal and informal income, Munch said, which can be generated through state positions, is rent-seeking – income without a corresponding investment of labour or capital. "Reportedly, ANA appointees also often maintain clients, so that patron-client networks, structured into competing factions, can be traced within the ANA down to the lowest levels. [...] There is evidence that Afghan officers and officials, especially in the higher echelons, appropriate large parts of the vast resource flows which are directed by international donors into the ANA."

Green-on-blue attacks 

"Green-on-blue" or "insider attacks," in which Afghan soldiers or police officers turned their weapons on American or European counterparts, became a major concern in 2010 and peaked in 2012—when they accounted for nearly 25% of ISAF casualties—before declining during 2013–2014 as international forces withdrew from the conflict. The scale of the insider attacks shocked CIA analysts, who could find no similar phenomenon during the Vietnam War, the Soviet–Afghan War, or any other counter-insurgency in modern history. The attacks accelerated during the Muslim holy month of Ramadan (which did not correlate with increased frequency of other kinds of militant activity in 2012) and a "copycat pattern" marked by an elevated risk of follow-up attacks within two days of the original incident was observed, but the underlying causes of this violence were debated. One theory—based on a 2011 study conducted by research psychologist Major Jeffrey T. Bordin, who interviewed Afghan and American troops regarding their perceptions of each other—posited that the insider attacks were the result of cultural incompatibility and resentment. However, a 2013 study by forensic psychiatrist Marc Sageman, a former CIA officer and academic, based on the US military's "15–6" case files and other documentary evidence, found zero insider attacks during 2012 that escalated directly from a feud or cultural misunderstanding between two officers who worked together. While approximately 10% of the cases were linked to high-profile provocations such as the 2012 Afghanistan Quran burning protests and the Kandahar massacre, JWICS intercepts showed that 56% of inside attackers interacted with the Taliban before deciding to strike, and there was circumstantial evidence of Taliban contact in a further 19% of cases. According to Sageman, the attackers were not Taliban cadres sent to infiltrate the Afghan army, but rather defectors who were persuaded to kill their erstwhile allies on their way out; to the extent that they were motivated by grievances, these were collective affronts to "Afghans" or "Muslims" as such, not personal slights, and their retaliatory violence was often indiscriminate, following the profile of a mass shooter. To reduce "green-on-blue" violence, ISAF soldiers were reminded to "respect Islam" and "avoid arrogance," armed guards were deployed as "guardian angels" to watch over joint exercises, and counterintelligence surveillance of previously vetted Afghan troops was expanded, among other preventative measures.

Growth in size 

The U.S. original targets as of April 2002 were ambitious, aiming to have 12,000 trained men ready by April 2003. A few months later it became obvious that such target was never going to be met and the training schedule was revised down to 9,000 men ready by November 2003.

Among initial plans were 31 Kandaks, or battalions. At one point, 28 of 31 battalions were publicly declared as combat ready. Four regional corps headquarters were initially created, growing by 2019 to seven.

US policy called for boosting the army's size to 134,000 soldiers by October 2010. By May 2010 the Afghan Army had accomplished this interim goal and was on track to reach its ultimate number of 171,000 by 2011. Actual numbers (as opposed to planned numbers) were around 164,000 in May 2011. This increase in Afghan troops allowed the US to begin withdrawing its forces in July 2011.

Due to the strong Taliban insurgency and many other problems, the ANA steadily expanded. An increasing number of female soldiers joined. By early 2013, reports stated that there were 200,000 ANA troops. However, the Special Inspector General for Afghanistan Reconstruction (SIGAR)  said in January 2013:

Determining ANSF strength is fraught with challenges. US and coalition forces rely on the Afghan forces to report their own personnel strength numbers. ..[T]he Combined Security Transition Command-Afghanistan.. noted that.. there is "no viable method of validating [the ANA's] personnel numbers."

It was reported in 2016 that the Afghan National Army had close to 1,000 officers with the rank of general, more than the number of generals in the United States Army.

Total Afghan Armed Forces manpower was approximately 186,000 as of 2021.

Human right abuses 
According to American journalist Annie Jacobsen, most Afghan fighters being trained by the US habitually used opium, and it was a constant struggle to field them in a sober state. The same book claimed that rape of Afghan recruits by other Afghan soldiers occurred in US-run military facilities, undermining combat readiness. Jacobsen wrote that a 2018 report by a US inspector general noted 5,753 cases of "gross human rights abuses by Afghan forces", including "routine enslavement and rape of underage boys by Afghan commanders" (Bacha bazi type practices).

According to a 2017 report by the Special Inspector General for Afghanistan Reconstruction (SIGAR), between of 2010 and 2016, the Department of Defense made 5,753 Leahy Law vetting requests for Afghan security forces. The Leahy law prohibits U.S. funding of foreign security units if there are credible reports of gross violation of human rights. According to SIGAR, between 2010 and 2016, 75 allegations of gross violations of human rights by Afghan security forces, including murder and 16 cases of child sexual assault were reported to the Department of Defense. Around a dozen Afghan units accused of abuses continued to receive U.S. funding due to an exception in the law allowing funding to continue if units are deemed to be important for "national security concern."

Bases and facilities in the late 2010s 

Large numbers of military bases were found across the country, including major ones in the provinces of Balkh, Farah, Ghazni, Herat, Kabul, Kandahar, Khost, Maidan Wardak, Nangarhar, Paktia, Paktika and Parwan. Some of these were built by the United States Army Corps of Engineers (USACE) while others by ISAF and Afghans. It was reported in 2010 that there were at least 700 military bases and outposts in Afghanistan. About 400 of them were used by ISAF forces with the remaining 300 or so by Afghan National Security Forces.

The National Military Academy of Afghanistan was built to educate officers, modeled after the United States Military Academy. The Marshal Fahim National Defense University was located in Kabul province and consists of a headquarters building, classrooms, dining facility, library, and medical clinic. In addition to this, an $80 million central command center was built next to the Hamid Karzai International Airport. The National Military Command Center was mentored by Virginia Army National Guard soldiers.

Sizable numbers of Afghan officers were trained in India, either at the Indian Military Academy in Dehradun, the National Defence Academy near Pune or the Officers Training Academy in Chennai. The Officers Training Academy on the other hand provided a 49-week course to graduate officer candidates. The Indian Military Academy provided a four-year degree to army officers, while the National Defence Academy provided a three-year degree after which officers undergo a one-year specialization in their respective service colleges. In 2014 the number of Afghan officers in training in India was nearly 1,100.

Arrival of military equipment 

The United States provided billions of dollars in military aid. One package included 2,500 Humvees, tens of thousands of M16 assault rifles and body armoured-jackets. It also included the building of a national military command center as well as training compounds in several provinces of the country. Canadian Forces supplied some army soldiers surplus Canadian-made Colt Canada C7 rifles but the Afghans returned the C7 in favor of the American-made M16 rifle, because the parts of the two rifles, despite being similar, were not fully interchangeable.

Besides the United States and its allies/partners, Afghanistan increasingly turned to India and Russia for assistance. Both countries supported the Northern Alliance, with funding, training, supplies and medical treatment of wounded fighters, against the Taliban prior to 2002. India had been reluctant to provide military aid due to fears of antagonizing its regional rival Pakistan. In 2013, after years of subtle reminders, the Afghan government sent a wish list of heavy weapons to India.The list includes as many as 150 battle tanks T-72, 120 (105 mm) field guns, a large number of 82 mm mortars, one medium lift transport aircraft AN-32, two squadrons of medium lift Mi-17 and attack helicopters Mi-35, and a large number of trucks. In 2014, India signed a deal with Russia and Afghanistan where it would pay Russia for all the heavy equipment requested by Afghanistan instead of directly supplying them. The deal also includes the refurbishment of heavy weapons left behind since the Soviet war.

The military budget reached $12 billion USD by 2011, mostly provided by aid. From 2001–2021, the United States spent an estimated $83 billion on the Afghan armed forces through the Afghanistan Security Forces Fund and an additional $36 billion to support the Afghan government.

Other state suppliers included ; ; France; Germany; Italy; ; ; the United Kingdom; and Uzbekistan.

As the size of the Armed Forces grew, so did the need for aircraft and vehicles. It was announced in 2011 that the Afghan Armed Forces would be provided with 145 aircraft, 21 helicopters and 23,000 vehicles. In 2012, Afghanistan became a major non-NATO ally of the United States. This meant the country was able to purchase and receive weapons from the United States without restrictions. In the meantime, the Afghan Air Force began seeking fighter aircraft and other advanced weapons. Defense Minister Wardak explained that "what we are asking to acquire is just the ability to defend ourselves, and also to be relevant in the future so that our friends and allies can count on us to participate in peacekeeping and other operations of mutual interest."
Whatever foreign advisors perceived as the right equipment mix, Afghans wanted main battle tanks, more artillery, other heavy weapons, as well as fighter and ground attack aircraft, plus attack helicopters. Donors' protests that equipment serviceability rates were dire, and such forces implausible, did not stop the requests coming.

Senior officers circa 2019 

 Defence Minister, General Bismillah Khan Mohammadi (acting)
 Defense Ministry Spokesman, Major General Dawlat Waziri
 Chief of General Staff, Lieutenant General Murad Ali Murad
 Vice Chief of the General Staff (VCoGS), Lieutenant General Yasin Zia 
 Deputy Chief of the General Staff (DoGS), Lieutenant General Mohammad Ikram
 Afghan Air Force Commander, Lieutenant General Mohammad Dawran
 Command Sergeant Major of the ANA, Sergeant Major Roshan Safi
 General Staff Chief of Personnel (GSG1), Lieutenant General Murad Ali Murad
 General Staff Chief of Intelligence (GSG2), Major General Abdul Khaliq Faryad
 General Staff Chief of Operations (GSG3), Major General Afzal Aman
 General Staff Chief of Logistics (GSG4), Lieutenant General Azizuddin Farahee
 General Staff Chief of Plans (GSG5), Major General Jan Kahn
 General Staff Chief of Communications (GSG6), Major General Mehrab Ali
 General Staff Chief of Doctrine & Training (GSG7), Major General Kushiwal
 General Staff Chief of Engineering (GSEng), Major General Muslim Amid
 General Staff Inspector General, Major General Jalandar Shah
 Surgeon General, Lieutenant General Dr. Abdul Qayum Tutakhail
 201st Selab ("Flood") Corps Commander, Major General Mohammad Rahim Wardak
 203rd Tandar ("Thunder") Corps Commander, Major General Abdul Khaleq
 205th Atal ("Hero") Corps Commander, Major General Sher Mohammad Zazai
 207th Zafar ("Victory") Corps Commander, Major General Jalandar Shah Behnam
 209th Shaheen ("Falcon") Corps Commander, Major General Murad Ali
 215th Maiwand Corps Commander, Major Gen. Sayed Malouk
 Afghan National Army Training Command, Major General Aminullah Karim
 ANA Special Operations Command
 ANA Recruiting Command, Lieutenant General Mohammad Eshaq Noori
 Headquarters Security and Support Brigade, Brigadier General Sadiq
 Command and General Staff College, Major General Rizak
 National Military Academy of Afghanistan, Major General Mohammad Sharef
 Kabul Military Training Centre, Brigadier General Mohammad Amin Wardak

See also 
Military history of Afghanistan
Soviet–Afghan War
War in Afghanistan
Ranks of the Afghan Armed Forces

References

Sources

Further reading
 
 
  288 pp.; £35.00.

External links 
 
 In the name of Allah, the Compassionate and Merciful Decree of the President of the Islamic Transitional State of Afghanistan on the Afghan National Army, issued on 1 December 2002, Petersberg, Germany
 Official website to August 2021

Military history of Afghanistan
21st-century military history
21st century in Afghanistan